The girls' doubles tournament of the 2007 European Junior Badminton Championships was held from 4 to 8 April 2007. Nina Vislova and Olga Kolzova from Russia clinched this title in the last edition.

Seeds 

  Gabrielle White / Mariana Agathangelou (semi-finals)
  Joan Christiansen / Line Damkjær Kruse (final)
  Samantha Barning / Patty Stolzenbach (second round)
  Maria Thorberg / Maja Bech (quarter-finals)

  Luboov Chudentceva / Victoria Slobodyanyuk (third round)
  Marlena Flis / Natalia Pocztowiak (quarter-finals)
  Olga Konon /  Kristína Ludíková (champions)
  Samantha Ward / Sarah Walker (semi-finals)

Draw

Finals

Top half

Section 1

Section 2

Bottom half

Section 3

Section 4

References

External links 
Tournament Link

2007 European Junior Badminton Championships